Ol' Paul, the Mighty Logger is an anthology of ten original Paul Bunyan tall tales: it was written and illustrated by Glen Rounds, and published by Holiday House in 1936. Upon its publication, Kirkus Reviews praised it, saying that "there's a harmony about this book -- the telling of familiar episodes from the Paul Bunyan legend, the homespun look of the paper, the virility of the line illustrations. . . . [A] book to read aloud." It was one of the seventeen books selected in the inaugural class of Lewis Carroll Shelf Award recipients in 1958.

References

1936 short story collections
1936 children's books
American children's books
Children's short story collections
Fiction anthologies
Paul Bunyan